William Battie (sometimes spelt Batty; 1 September 1703 – 13 June 1776) was an English physician who published in 1758 the first lengthy book on the treatment of mental illness, A Treatise on Madness, and by extending methods of treatment to the poor as well as the affluent, helped raise psychiatry to a respectable specialty. He was President of the Royal College of Physicians in 1764.

Biography
He was born in 1703 or 1704, the son of a vicar, Reverend Edward Battie, in Modbury, Devon. He studied at Eton and King's College, Cambridge. Being unable to afford a legal training he "diverted his attention to physic" and practised for a short time in Cambridge. After practising for many years in the field of psychiatry in London, he acquired two private "madhouses" near St Luke's Hospital for Lunatics, from which he gained a handsome income. His appointment as chief physician at St. Luke's gave him a firm base upon which to consolidate his reputation.

He was elected in January, 1742 a Fellow of the Royal Society.
He was, in 1764, the first and only psychiatrist to become President of the Royal College of Physicians.

He died following a stroke in 1776 and was buried alongside his wife in Kingston, Surrey.

Psychiatric work
Shortly after commencing at St Luke's, Battie restarted discussion on the management of mental disorder in his Treatise on Madness (1758). It was in large part a critique aimed particularly at the Bethlem Hospital, where a conservative regime continued to use routinely coercive and barbaric custodial treatment, with crowded cells and jeering visitors. Battie instead argued for a tailored management of patients entailing cleanliness, good food, fresh air, and distraction from friends and family. He offered some arguments, based on the work of Locke, that insanity could result from the wrong joining together of ideas rather than simply uncontrolled and disturbed animal passions. However his main theme was that mental disorder originated from dysfunction of the material brain and body rather than the internal workings of the mind and he proposed somatic treatments in keeping with his times, which he classified as involving either "depletion", "revulsion", "removal" or "expulsion". It was not until the York Retreat in 1796 that a radically more humane psychosocial approach was implemented in England.

Battie's treatise elicited a response from John Monro, the physician to Bethlem Hospital, who saw it as an attack on his father, who had preceded him, and himself. This response has been described as narrow and reactionary, but it has also been called the first debate in psychiatry.

Battie insisted that psychiatric disorders were curable:
"Madness is ... as manageable as many other distempers, which are equally dreadful and obstinate, and yet are not looked upon as incurable; such unhappy objects ought by no means to be abandoned, much less shut up in loathsome prisons as criminals or nuisances to society".

References

 
 
 Burkhart Brückner, Robin Pape: Biography of William Battie in: Biographical Archive of Psychiatry (BIAPSY).

External links 

 

1703 births
1776 deaths
People from South Hams (district)
English psychiatrists
People educated at Eton College
Alumni of King's College, Cambridge
Fellows of the Royal College of Physicians
Fellows of the Royal Society
Presidents of the Royal College of Physicians
18th-century English medical doctors
Burials in Surrey
Medical doctors from Devon